Diane Elizabeth Kirkby,  (born 24 July 1948) is an Australian historian and academic.

Early life and education
Diane Elizabeth Kirkby was born in Walgett, New South Wales, in 1948. Her education began by correspondence course and at age six she was sent to board in Tamworth at the Church of England Girls School and later to Presbyterian Ladies' College, Pymble. Her high school education was completed at Camden High School.

Honours and recognition
Kirkby was elected fellow of the Academy of the Social Sciences in Australia in 2005 and fellow of the Australian Academy of the Humanities in 2011.

Works

References

1948 births
Living people
Australian historians
Academic staff of La Trobe University
Academic staff of the University of Melbourne
University of Melbourne women
University of New South Wales alumni
University of California, Santa Barbara alumni
Fellows of the Academy of Social Sciences
Fellows of the Australian Academy of the Humanities